The Creation Cinema series from Creation Books is a collection of books dealing with film history and pop culture.

Creation Cinema books
Killing for Culture: An Illustrated History of Death Film from Mondo to Snuff (Creation Cinema #1)
Inside Teradome: An Illustrated History of Freak Film (Creation Cinema #2)
Deathtripping: The Cinema of Transgression (Creation Cinema #3)
Fragments of Fear: An Illustrated History of British Horror Films (Creation Cinema #4)
Desperate Visions: The Films of John Waters & the Kuchar Brothers (Creation Cinema #5)
House of Horror: The Complete Hammer Films Story (Creation Cinema #6)
Naked Lens: Beat Cinema (Creation Cinema #7)
Meat Is Murder!: An Illustrated Guide to Cannibal Culture (Creation Cinema #8)
Eros in Hell: Sex, Blood and Madness in Japanese Cinema (Creation Cinema #9)
Charlie's Family: An Illustrated Screenplay to the Film by Jin VanBebber (Creation Cinema #10)
Renegade Sisters: Girl Gangs On Film (Creation Cinema #11)
Babylon Blue: An Illustrated History of Adult Cinema (Creation Cinema #12)
Hollywood Hex: Death and Destiny in the Dream Factory (Creation Cinema #13)
A Taste of Blood: The Film of Herschell Gordon Lewis (Creation Cinema #14)
Lost Highways: An Illustrated History of the Road Movie (Creation Cinema #15)
Addicted: An Illustrated Guide to Drug Cinema (Creation Cinema #16)
The Satanic Screen: An Illustrated History of the Devil In Cinema (Creation Cinema #17)
Bad Blood: An Illustrated History of Psycho Cinema (Creation Cinema #18)
Search and Destroy: An Illustrated Guide to Vietnam War Movies (Creation Cinema #19)
The Bad Mirror: A Creation Cinema Collection Reader

References
Creation Books/Creation Cinema (English) Creation Books Retrieved on 2008-2-20

Books about film
History of film